Ernst Wilhelm Borchert, or just Wilhelm Borchert, (13 March 1907 in Rixdorf – 1 June 1990 in Berlin) was a German actor. He was also a voice actor for audio books and films.

Theater 
After graduating, Borchert pursued a degree in acting at the Reicherschen Hochschule für dramatische Kunst (Reicherschen School for dramatic arts) from 1926-27.

For his talent in acting, Borchert became a Staatsschauspieler (Actor of the state) and a Honorary member of the State Theater of Berlin in 1973. He was also a member of the Akademie der Künste Berlin until 1976. Borchert equally impressed the public and critics in classic hero roles. He was the first to play Woyzeck after the war.

 1948: Ben Jonson (Bearbeitet von Stefan Zweig): Volpone (Sohn) – Regie: Willi Schmidt (Deutsches Theater Berlin)
 1948: William Shakespeare: Maß für Maß (Angelo) – Regie: Wolfgang Langhoff (Deutsches Theater Berlin – Kammerspiele)
 1949: Lion Feuchtwanger: Wahn in Boston (Mathers Schwager) – Regie: Wolfgang Kühne (Deutsches Theater Berlin – Kammerspiele)
 1949: Johann Wolfgang von Goethe: Faust I (Faust) – (Städtische Bühnen Magdeburg)
 1949: Gotthold Ephraim Lessing: Nathan der Weise (Tempelherr) – Regie: Gerda Müller (Deutsches Theater Berlin)
 1949: Johann Wolfgang von Goethe: Faust. Eine Tragödie. (Faust) – Regie: Wolfgang Langhoff (Deutsches Theater Berlin)
 1949: Friedrich Wolf: Tai Yang erwacht (Führer der Revolutionäre) – Regie: Wolfgang Langhoff (Deutsches Theater Berlin) Film

Films 

 1941: U-Boote westwärts!
 1943: Der ewige Klang
 1946: Die Mörder sind unter uns
 1949: Schicksal aus zweiter Hand
 1953: Die Wüste lebt (Erzählstimme)
 1954: Sauerbruch – Das war mein Leben
 1955:  Master of Life and Death 
 1960: Die Botschafterin 
 1965: Willkommen in Altamont
 1988: In einem Land vor unserer Zeit

Dubbing  
Next to theater Borchert worked between 1945 and 1989 as a dubbing actor. He replaced many actors voices, including: 
 Eddie Albert (The Heartbreak Kid)
 Martin Balsam (Frau mit Vergangenheit)
 Julian Beck (Poltergeist II: The Other Side) (Reverend Henry Kane)
 Richard Burton (Cleopatra und The Longest Day)
 Gary Cooper (Friendly Persuasion)
 Bing Crosby (Robin and the 7 Hoods)
 José Ferrer (The Caine Mutiny)
 Mel Ferrer (Engel der Gejagten)
 Henry Fonda (Once Upon a Time in the West and My Name is Nobody)
 John Gielgud (Arthur)
 Alec Guinness (Star Wars and The Bridge on the River Kwai)
 Rex Harrison (The Foxes of Harrow)
 Charlton Heston (Ben-Hur and Ten Commandments)
 Trevor Howard (Outcast of the Islands)
 Rock Hudson (Back to God's Country)
 Alan Ladd (Saskatchewan)
 Burt Lancaster (Judgment at Nuremberg)
 James Mason (Prince Valiant)
 Laurence Olivier (The Shoes of the Fisherman and Clash of the Titans)
 Peter O’Toole (The Lion in Winter)
 Ronald Reagan (The Killers)
 Edward G. Robinson (The Biggest Bundle of Them All)
 Max von Sydow (The Greatest Story Ever Told)
 John Wayne (She Wore a Yellow Ribbon)
 Johnny Weissmüller (Tarzan and the Mermaids)
 Orson Welles (The Roots of Heaven)
 Richard Widmark (Broken Lance).

Audiobooks 
He also voiced many audiobooks.

 1948: Arnaud d’Usseau/James Gow: Tief sind die Wurzeln (Brett Charles) – Regie: Hans Küpper (Berliner Rundfunk)
 1950: Jacques Roumain: Herr über den Tau – Regie: Hanns Farenburg  (Berliner Rundfunk)
 2004: Krieg der Sterne – Eine Neue Hoffnung, Episode 4, Das Hörspiel zum Kinofilm, Universal, 
 2004: Das Imperium Schlägt Zurück, Episode 5, Das Hörspiel zum Kinofilm, Universal, 
 2004: Die Rückkehr der Jedi Ritter, Episode 6, Das Hörspiel zum Kinofilm, Universal,

Awards 
 1976: Berliner Kunstpreis

References

External links 

 
Ernst-Wilhelm-Borchert-Archiv In archive the Akademie der Künste, Berlin

1907 births
1990 deaths
Male actors from Berlin
German male film actors
German male voice actors
20th-century German male actors